Licurici is a commune in Gorj County, Oltenia, Romania. It is composed of four villages: Frumușei, Licurici, Negreni and Totea.

Natives
 Dumitru Burlan

References

Communes in Gorj County
Localities in Oltenia